Ozius is a genus of crabs in the family Menippidae, containing the following species:

Ozius deplanatus (White, 1847)
Ozius granulosus De Man, 1879
Ozius guttatus H. Milne-Edwards, 1834
Ozius hawaiiensis Rathbun, 1902
Ozius lobatus Heller, 1865
Ozius perlatus Stimpson, 1860
Ozius reticulatus (Desbonne in Desbonne & Schramm, 1867)
Ozius rugulosus Stimpson, 1858
Ozius tenuidactylus (Lockington, 1877)
Ozius tricarinatus Rathbun, 1907
Ozius truncatus H. Milne-Edwards, 1834
Ozius tuberculosus H. Milne-Edwards, 1834
Ozius verreauxii Saussure, 1853

References

Eriphioidea
Taxa named by Henri Milne-Edwards